Yeyi (autoethnonym Shiyɛyi) is a Bantu language spoken by many of the approximately 50,000 Yeyi people along the Okavango River in Namibia and Botswana. Yeyi, influenced by Juu languages, is one of several Bantu languages along the Okavango with clicks. Indeed, it has the largest known inventory of clicks of any Bantu language, with dental, alveolar, palatal, and lateral articulations. Though most of its older speakers prefer Yeyi in normal conversation, it is being gradually phased out in Botswana by a popular move towards Tswana, with Yeyi only being learned by children in a few villages. Yeyi speakers in the Caprivi Strip of north-eastern Namibia, however, retain Yeyi in villages (including Linyanti), but may also speak the regional lingua franca, Lozi.

The main dialect is called Shirwanga. A slight majority of Botswana Yeyi are monolingual in the national language, Tswana, and most of the rest are bilingual.

Classification
Yeyi appears to be a divergent lineage of Bantu. It is usually classified as a member of the R Zone Bantu languages. The language has been phonetically influenced by the Ju languages, though it is no longer in contact with them.

Phonology

Vowels

Vowel length is also distinctive.
 Vowel sounds  are phonetically noted .
 Sounds  can be heard as nasalized  when preceding nasal consonants. A nasal  can also be heard, but only in stem-internal position.
 Sounds  can tend to be centralized as  following fricative and sibilant sounds.

Consonants 

 A glottal stop sound  can also occur, but only between vowels.
 Palatalized-velar stop consonants  may often be heard as palatal stop consonants .
 A labial approximant sound  can range from an approximant sound to a fricative sound .
 An alveolar rhotic consonant  can be heard as a tap or a trill, but can also be heard as a retroflex tap .
 An alveolar lateral consonant  can also be heard as a retroflex lateral .

 Prenasal palatalized-velar stop consonants  may often be heard as prenasal palatal stop consonants .

Click consonants

Lateral sounds only rarely occur.

Clicks
Yeyi may have up to four click types, dental , alveolar , palatal , and lateral . However, the actual number of clicks is disputed, as researchers disagree on how many series of manner and phonation the language contrasts.

Sommer & Voßen (1992) listed the following manners, shown as the palatal series:

The uvular ejective series was uncertain due to infrequency.

Fulop et al. (2002) studied the clicks of a limited vocabulary sample with 13 Yeyi speakers who were not from the core speaking area. The series they found are:

In addition, a reported uvular affricated click appears to actually be velar, with the affrication a variant of aspiration, and so has been included under . There is similar velar affrication with the dental ejective click among some speakers. The ejective clicks are apparently uvular.

Miller (2011), in a comparative study with other languages, interprets their results as follows,

The contrast between ejective and glottalized nasal clicks is unusual, but also occurs in Gǀwi.

Unfortunately, the speakers interviewed were not from the core Yeyi-speaking area, and they often disagreed on which clicks to use. Although the six dental clicks ( etc.) were nearly universal, only one of the lateral clicks was (the voiced click ). The alveolar clicks ( etc.) were universal apart from the ejective, which was only attested from one speaker, but two of the palatal clicks were only used by half the speakers, at least in the sample vocabulary. The missing palatal and lateral clicks were substituted with alveolar or sometimes dental clicks (palatals only), and the missing ejective alveolar was substituted with a glottalized alveolar. Both of these patterns are consistent with studies of click loss, though it is possible that these speakers maintain these clicks in other words. 23 of the 24 possible permutations were attested in the sample vocabulary by at least one speaker, the exception being the ejective lateral click . This research needs to be repeated in an area where the language is still vibrant.

Seidel (2008) says that Yeyi has three click types, dental , alveolar , and, in two words only, lateral .  There are three basic series, tenuis, aspirated, and voiced, any of which may be prenasalized:

A Yeyi Talking Dictionary was produced by Living Tongues Institute for Endangered Languages.

References

Bibliography

External links
 Yeyi Clicks: Acoustic Description and Analysis (2003)

 
Bantu languages
Click languages
Languages of Botswana
Languages of Namibia
Endangered languages of Africa
Endangered Niger–Congo languages